The Socialist Party is a political party in Ireland, active in both the Republic of Ireland and Northern Ireland. Internationally, it is affiliated to the Trotskyist International Socialist Alternative. 
The party has been involved in various populist campaigns including the Anti-Bin Tax Campaign and the Campaign Against Home and Water Taxes. Members of the party were jailed for their part in the former, while members have been arrested for their role in the latter. It had a seat in the European Parliament from 2009 to 2014. In 2015, the party received state funding of €132,000.

From 2014, the party's election candidates in the Republic did not stand for election directly on the Socialist Party platform, but have instead run as candidates of the Anti-Austerity Alliance (AAA), now Solidarity, which was a registered party in its own right between 2014 and 2015 and which continues to contest elections as part of People Before Profit–Solidarity (PBP–S). Socialist Party members Ruth Coppinger, Mick Barry and former member Paul Murphy, were elected in this way as TDs in the 32nd Dáil. Similarly, in 2016 the Socialist Party in Northern Ireland instead fielded candidates in the Cross Community Labour Alternative. In 2022, however, the party ran once again in the North as the Socialist Party.

History
The party was formed by former members of the Labour Party, collectively known as the Militant Tendency, who were expelled in 1989 having been accused of Trotskyist entryism. They formed Militant Labour, which became the Socialist Party in 1996.

Foundation and Split from the Labour Party
The party was founded in 1972 as a tendency within the Labour Party, grouped around the newsletter Militant Irish Monthly. The tendency organised within the Labour Party throughout the 1970s and 1980s, attempting to win the party towards socialism, and briefly controlled Labour Youth from 1983 to 1986. People associated with it include Dermot Connolly, Clare Daly, Finn Geaney, Joe Higgins and John Throne. In the late 1980s, a number of known members were expelled from Labour. In 1989 they established an independent party, adopting the title Militant Labour—also used by other sections of the Committee for a Workers' International at the time. In 1996 the party merged fully with the Labour and Trade Union Group of Northern Ireland and changed its name to the Socialist Party. The Socialist Party has been built some electoral support in the Republic of Ireland. It found it harder to gain an electoral foothold in Northern Ireland, but it has maintained a minor presence in the trade union movement there, as well as a youth wing.

1996–2002 (27th and 28th Dáil)
Militant Labour was renamed the Socialist Party in 1996, and came to wider attention among the general public when Joe Higgins polled just 252 votes behind victor Brian Lenihan Jnr in the Dublin-West by-election of that same year. In the general election of the following year, Higgins was elected to Dáil Éireann for the first time.

2002–2007 (29th Dáil)

At the 2002 general election, Joe Higgins retained his Dublin West seat in Dáil Éireann. Clare Daly narrowly missed out on gaining a second seat for the party in the Dublin North constituency.

The Anti-Bin Tax Campaign came about at this time. On 19 September 2003, Higgins and Daly were sent to Mountjoy Prison for a month after refusing to abide by a High Court injunction relating to the blockading of bin lorries.

At the 2004 local elections, the Socialist Party gained two council seats, with Mick Murphy being elected to South Dublin County Council and Mick Barry being elected to Cork City Council. The party also retained their two previous seats (held by Daly and Ruth Coppinger) on Fingal County Council. At the European election held on the same day, Joe Higgins received 23,218 (5.5%) votes in the Dublin constituency, but did not win a seat.

Councillor Mick Murphy was responsible for bringing the GAMA construction scandal to light in October 2004. This involved a group of Turkish workers being brought to Ireland by GAMA, a Turkish construction company. They were illegally underpaid and forced to work hours in breach of the EU Working Time Directive. Murphy discovered the workers living on the building site where they were employed. After contacting the local council, GAMA and trade union officials and remaining unenlightened, Murphy wrote a leaflet in English, had it translated into Turkish "mainly to say that we had no problem with them being here, and saying what GAMA had said", then threw it over the hoarding surrounding the site. Murphy brought it to the attention of his party colleague Joe Higgins, who was then a TD for Dublin West, and Higgins raised the matter in Dáil Éireann on 8 February 2005, bringing public awareness to the workers' plight. The exploitation included migrant Turkish construction workers bring employed on state projects, being paid as little as €2.20 an hour (the minimum wage in Ireland was €7.00) while being forced to work up to 80 hours per week. This led to a strike by immigrant workers in Ireland. The exploited workers each won tens of thousand of euro worth of unpaid wages and overtime.

2007–2011 (30th Dáil)
At the 2007 general election, Joe Higgins lost his Dublin West seat and the Socialist Party was left without a TD for the first time since 1997. The Party campaigned for a "no" vote the 2008 and 2009 referendums on the Treaty of Lisbon.

At the 2009 European and local elections, Joe Higgins won a seat in the Dublin constituency with 50,510 (12.4%) first preference votes, as well as gaining a seat in the Castleknock local electoral area of Fingal County Council. The party held its seats on Fingal County and Cork City Council (Ruth Coppinger and Mick Barry respectively), while gaining one seat each on Balbriggan Town Council and Drogheda Borough Council. However, the party lost Mick Murphy, its only councillor on South Dublin County Council.

2011–2016 (31st Dáil)
At the 2011 general election the Socialist Party returned two TDs to Dáil Éireann: Clare Daly was elected for the Dublin North constituency, while Joe Higgins regained his seat in Dublin West. The Socialist Party contested this election as part of the United Left Alliance (ULA), an alliance of far-left parties which included both People Before Profit (PBP) and Workers and Unemployed Action Group (WUAG), as well as independent activists. The Alliance won five seats in the national parliament. Higgins resigned his European Parliament seat, and Paul Murphy was selected by the party to replace him. Following the death of Brian Lenihan Jnr, the Socialist Party contested the 2011 Dublin West by-election, with its candidate Ruth Coppinger coming in third. The Socialist Party also called for a referendum on the December 2011 EU deal, which it opposed.

In 2012, legal advice was sought when it emerged that the expenses given to Higgins and Daly as TDs may have been used for travel outside their constituencies and journeys to the Dáil. Public expenditure minister Brendan Howlin subsequently confirmed that TDs were, in fact, entitled to claim expenses for travel outside their constituencies and that Daly and Higgins were guilty of no wrongdoing. The Socialist Party and ULA said the story was a "manufactured controversy", part of a "vindictive smear campaign by Independent Newspapers", which were owned by billionaire Denis O'Brien.

Clare Daly resigned from the Socialist Party in August 2012, following a dispute over her support of Independent TD Mick Wallace, whom the party had called on to resign after the revelation of tax irregularities. The Socialist Party left the ULA in January 2013.

Socialist Party members contested the 2014 local elections as part of the Anti-Austerity Alliance. The party gained seats on Limerick and Cork City Councils, making it "a national rather than Dublin-centric alliance". The Dublin West by-election of the same day returned Ruth Coppinger to Dáil Éireann, giving Dublin West two Socialist Party TDs. Paul Murphy was unsuccessful in retaining the Socialist Party's European seat at this time but was elected to Dáil Éireann that October after a surprise victory in the Dublin South-West by-election, which the Sinn Féin candidate had been favourite to win.

The party altered its registered name in 2014 to Stop the Water Tax – Socialist Party. In 2015, water charge protestors, including party elected representatives Paul Murphy, Kieran Mahon and Mick Murphy, were arrested. The arrests led to accusations of "political policing" and sparked minor solidarity protests across Europe, including in London, Berlin, Vienna and Stockholm.

2016–2020 (32nd Dáil)

In the 2016 general election Murphy and Coppinger were re-elected in Dublin South-West and Dublin West, respectively, and Barry was elected in Cork North-Central, all of them running as Anti-Austerity Alliance–People Before Profit members.
For the 2016 Assembly Election, the Socialist Party in Northern Ireland supported Cross-Community Labour Alternative and critically called for a vote for the People Before Profit as the two parties did not stand candidates in the same constituencies.

In 2019, divisions in the party resulting from a split in the Committee for a Workers' International led to Paul Murphy TD leaving to form RISE. The split separately led to the formation of Militant Left, which aligned with the Committee for a Workers' International (Refounded), a body predominantly supported by the Socialist Party of England and Wales.

2020–present (33rd Dáil)
In the 2020 general election, Mick Barry was re-elected in Cork North-Central but Ruth Coppinger lost her seat in Dublin West.

Policies

According to its website, the Socialist Party "stands for the socialist alternative to the dictatorship of the markets – namely real democracy whereby ordinary people take centre stage in running society, with democratic public ownership of banks, of key sectors of the economy and industry, and a democratic plan of the economy to provide for the needs of people". It opposes the so-called "Social Partnership" deals and those in the trade union movement who advocate them, considering the agreements detrimental to the well-being of workers. It also holds influence in the Northern Irish branch of the FBU, where its members played a key role in encouraging the FBU's split from the British Labour Party in 2004, as well as influence in NIPSA with members in the NIPSA Broad Left faction.

The Socialist Party is Eurosceptic and supported Brexit, considering the EU to be a "club of bosses and bankers" and rejecting reform attempts due to there being "almost no mechanisms of democratic accountability" in the EU.

The Socialist Party opposes sectarian divisions in Northern Ireland between Protestants and Catholics and seeks to bring working class unity to both sides of the border. They argue that capitalism is incapable of overcoming sectarianism. The Socialist Party take a critical view of the Good Friday Agreement and other subsequent initiatives, claiming it further entrenches and institutionalises sectarianism and doesn't work towards solving the fundamental causes of the conflict. They therefore oppose a border poll and believe calling one would further polarise Catholic and Protestant communities. Instead, the Socialist Party believes that Ireland, England, Scotland, and Wales should merge and form a socialist federation, which should aspire to be part of a Socialist Federation of Europe. The Phoenix has opined that the Socialist Party's position is a "bizarre fusion of Trotskyism and British Unionism" that "articulates a unionist outlook dressed in socialist rhetoric".

The Socialist Party is pro-choice. Their members staged an 'abortion pill bus' during the campaign to repeal the 8th, where they travelled across Ireland distributing abortion pills.

List of newspapers and publications
 The Socialist (formerly Socialist Voice, The Voice, and Militant) – Monthly newspaper
 Socialist Alternative (formerly Socialism 2000 and later "Socialist View") – Quarterly Theoretical Journal
 International Socialist Voice – E-Zine
 Fingal Socialist – Free paper distributed in Northern and Western Dublin
 Cork Socialist – Free paper distributed in Cork city

Election results

Dáil Éireann

Northern Ireland Assembly

Local

European
The Socialist Party has contested European elections in the Republic of Ireland but not in Northern Ireland.

See also
List of political parties in the United Kingdom opposed to austerity

References

External links

 Socialist Party – Official website
 Socialist Party in Northern Ireland – Official website
 Socialist Youth – Youth section website
 Campaign Against the Water Tax – Website
 International Socialist Alternative – to which the Socialist Party is affiliated

1996 establishments in Ireland
All-Ireland political parties
Anti-austerity political parties in the United Kingdom
Anti-capitalist political parties
Communist parties in Ireland
Democratic socialist parties in Europe
Eurosceptic parties in Ireland
Far-left political parties
Far-left politics in Ireland
Ireland
Political parties established in 1996
Socialist parties in Ireland
 
Trotskyist organisations in Ireland